Exaireta is a genus of soldier flies in the family Stratiomyidae.

Species
Exaireta siliacea (White, 1916)
Exaireta spinigera (Wiedemann, 1830)

References

External links

 

Stratiomyidae
Brachycera genera
Diptera of Australasia
Taxa named by Ignaz Rudolph Schiner